HD 47186 b is a “hot Neptune” extrasolar planet located approximately 123 light years away in the constellation of Canis Major, orbiting the star HD 47186. This planet has a minimum mass of 22.78 times that of Earth and  orbits very close to the star at a similar distance from the star as 51 Pegasi b is from 51 Pegasi. As in consequence, it takes 4.0845 days to complete an orbit with an eccentricity of 0.038, which is similar to the 5.66 year-period planet HD 70642 b.

References

External links 
 

Canis Major
Exoplanets discovered in 2008
Giant planets
Exoplanets detected by radial velocity
Hot Neptunes